The Cumberland Valley Subdivision (also CV Subdivision) is a railroad line owned and operated by the CSX Railroad (CSX Transportation) in the U.S. states of Kentucky and Virginia. The line runs from Corbin, Kentucky, east to Big Stone Gap, Virginia, along a former Louisville and Nashville Railroad line.

At its west end, the CC Subdivision heads north to Cincinnati, Ohio, and the KD Subdivision heads south to Etowah, Tennessee. The east end is at an interchange with the Norfolk Southern Railway Appalachia District, where CSX trains can proceed south to the Kingsport Subdivision at Frisco, Tennessee, via trackage rights.

The original L&N line crossed the Cumberland Mountains at Cumberland Gap. The main line was moved east to use the Hagans Tunnel around 1930.

References

CSX Transportation lines
Rail infrastructure in Kentucky
Rail infrastructure in Virginia
Louisville and Nashville Railroad